Five Points, Wisconsin may refer to places in the U.S. state of Wisconsin:
Five Points, Dane County, Wisconsin, an unincorporated community
Five Points, Grant County, Wisconsin, an unincorporated community
Five Points, Richland County, Wisconsin, an unincorporated community